Jeong Soon-won (born March 26, 1974), better known by his stage name The One is a South Korean singer and vocal coach. He debuted in 1997 as a member the group Space A and released his first solo album in 2002. He has released a total of five albums in Korean and one in Mandarin. As a vocal coach, he has taught K-pop singers including members of Girls' Generation (most notably Taeyeon) and Super Junior.

He won the second season of the Korean version of I Am a Singer in 2012, and finished in third place in the third season in the Chinese version of I Am A Singer in 2015.

Discography

Studio albums
 2002: The Last Gift, The One!
 2004: The One
 2008: The Last
 2011: Walking Again  (다시 걷는다)
 2014: Who's The One I'm The One

References

1974 births
Living people
21st-century South Korean  male singers